Graz Entertainment is an American licensing and distribution company, run by Jim and Stephanie Graziano, which obtains and provides programming and licensing rights for children's television animation. They currently control Z Blade, The Attic, Goliath, Tom Thumb, and others.

List of licensed/distributed shows 
 The Adventures of Corduroy (1996–1997, co-produced with Benjamin Productions, Lin Oliver Productions and Viacom Productions, distributed by Paramount Television)
 Conan the Adventurer (1992, Season 1 only; co-produced with Sunbow Productions, distributed by Claster Television)
 Conan and the Young Warriors (1994, co-produced with Sunbow Productions, distributed by Claster Television)
 Darkstalkers (1995, co-produced with Capcom, distributed by The Summit Media Group)
 G.I. Joe Extreme (1995, co-produced with Sunbow Entertainment and Gunther-Wahl Productions, distributed by Claster Television)
 The Land Before Time II: The Great Valley Adventure (1994, co-produced with Universal Cartoon Studios, distributed by MCA/Universal Home Video
 My Little Pony Tales (1992, co-produced with Sunbow Productions, distributed by Claster Television)
 Ronin Warriors (1995, distributed by CINAR [Canada]/Claster Television [USA])
 Sgt. Savage and his Screaming Eagles (1994, co-produced with Sunbow Productions, distributed by Claster Television)
 Skeleton Warriors (1994–1995, co-production with Landmark Entertainment Group, distributed by Westinghouse Broadcasting International)
 Stone Protectors (1993, co-production with Sachs TV Entertainment)
 Street Fighter (1993, Season 1 only, co-produced with USA Studios and Capcom, distributed by ADV Films)
 The Tick (1994–1996, co-produced with Sunbow Productions and Fox Children's Productions, distributed by 20th Television)
 X-Men (1992–1997, co-produced with Saban Entertainment)

See also 
 Sunbow Productions
 MCA/Universal Studios
 The Summit Media Group

References 

American animation studios